Tony Schwartz (born May 2, 1952) is an American journalist and business book author who is best known for ghostwriting Trump: The Art of the Deal.

Early life and education
Schwartz was born to Irving Schwartz and Felice Schwartz, the founder of the nonprofit organization Catalyst, Inc., which works to build inclusive workplaces and expand opportunities for women and businesses. In 1974, Schwartz graduated Phi Beta Kappa from the University of Michigan, where he majored in American Studies.

Career
Schwartz began his career as a writer in 1975 and spent 25 years as a journalist. Schwartz was a columnist for The New York Post, associate editor at Newsweek, reporter for The New York Times, and staff writer at New York Magazine and Esquire.

In 1985, Schwartz began interviewing Donald Trump to ghostwrite Trump: The Art of the Deal (1987), for which he was credited as co-author. According to Schwartz, Trump wrote none of the book, choosing only to remove a few critical mentions of business colleagues at the end of the process.

In 1995, Schwartz wrote What Really Matters: Searching for Wisdom in America. In 1998, he co-authored Risking Failure, Surviving Success with Michael Eisner, then the CEO of The Walt Disney Company. In 1999, Schwartz joined LGE Performance Systems, a training company, where he served as President until 2003. In the same year, Schwartz co-authored The Power of Full Engagement: Managing Energy Not Time with LGE chairman Jim Loehr.

Schwartz founded The Energy Project in 2003 and launched The Energy Project Europe in 2005, with headquarters outside London. This is a consulting firm that focuses on the improvement of employee productivity and counts Facebook as one of its clients. In October 2007, Schwartz's article "Manage Energy Not Time: The Science of Stamina", co-authored with The Energy Project's former COO Catherine McCarthy, was published in the Harvard Business Review (HBR).  The article described the impact of The Energy Project curriculum at three Fortune 500 companies. In June 2010, Schwartz published another article in the HBR called "The Productivity Paradox: How Sony Pictures Gets More Out of People by Demanding Less", covering Sony Pictures's implementation of Energy Project guidelines. He has blogged in the HBR.

Schwartz's book The Way We're Working Isn't Working: Fueling the Four Needs that Energize Great Performance, co-authored with The Energy Project Europe's chairman Jean Gomes and Catherine McCarthy, was published in May 2010. It later was republished under the title Be Excellent at Anything: The Four Keys To Transforming the Way We Work and Live for a short time. Now, the book can be found under its original title.

Schwartz began writing a bi-weekly column for The New York Times financial news report, DealBook, titled Life@Work in May 2013. In 2014, Schwartz co-wrote the article "Why You Hate Work" with Georgetown University McDonough School of Business Associate Professor, Christine Porath about a collaboration between Harvard Business Review (HBR) and The Energy Project to find out what makes people productive and engaged at work.

In July 2016, Schwartz was the subject of an article in The New Yorker in which he described Donald Trump, who was running for President of the United States at the time, in unfavorable terms. Schwartz said he came to regret writing The Art of the Deal.  Schwartz repeated his criticism on Good Morning America, saying he "put lipstick on a pig", and again on Real Time with Bill Maher.

In mid-September 2020, Schwartz discussed a preview of his forthcoming book with MSNBC's Ari Melber, saying that 'Trump “is a prisoner of his lies” and questions who he’ll destroy first: himself or his country'.

Books
 Trump: The Art of the Deal with Donald Trump (Random House, 1987) 
 What Really Matters: Searching for Wisdom in America (Bantam, 1995) 
 Work in Progress: Risking Failure, Surviving Success with Michael Eisner (Random House, 1998) 
 The Power of Full Engagement: Managing Energy, Not Time, Is the Key to High Performance and Personal Renewal with Jim Loehr (Free Press, 2003) 
 Be Excellent at Anything: The Four Keys to Transforming the Way We Work and Live with Jean Gomes and Catherine McCarthy, Ph.D. (Free Press, 2010)  also published under the title The Way We're Working Isn't Working: The Four Forgotten Needs That Energize Great Performance (Free Press, 2010)  
 Dealing with the Devil: My Mother, Trump and Me (Audible Original, 2020)

References

External links 

 

Living people
American bloggers
American chief executives
American male writers
Jewish American writers
Ghostwriters
1952 births
Place of birth missing (living people)
American male bloggers
Criticism of Donald Trump